Gordon David Nunn (1927–2008), better known as Bunny Nunn, was an Australian soccer player who played as a forward.

Early life
Nunn attended Bundamba State School before learning signwriting at the Ipswich Technical College.

During World War II, Nunn served with the Royal Australian Air Force with Air Sea Rescue. His service number was 171508.

Club career
As a 17-year-old Nunn made his debut for Ipswich club St Helens. From 1951 he spent three seasons with Brisbane Caledonians before returning to St Helens in 1954.
 He later moved again to Brisbane to play for Azzurri.

International career
Nunn played 11 times for Australia in full internationals, scoring seven times. He has been designated as Socceroo #110.

Personal life
Nunn married Elizabeth Grieve Smith in 1950. They had four children and she predeceased him in 1972.

References

1927 births
2008 deaths
Australian soccer players
Association football forwards
Australia international soccer players
Royal Australian Air Force airmen
Royal Australian Air Force personnel of World War II